Andy Umberger is an American actor who spent the early part of his career in New York City, where he was primarily a stage actor and appeared in three Broadway shows: City of Angels, Passion and Company.  Since moving to Los Angeles in the late 90s, he has had supporting roles in over 15 films and has guest starred on over 60 television shows, with recurring roles on 10 different series, including:  Mad Men, Weeds, Boston Legal, The West Wing, Desperate Housewives, ER, and as D'Hoffryn on Buffy the Vampire Slayer.  He is one of only five actors to appear in three series created by Joss Whedon (Buffy the Vampire Slayer, Angel and Firefly).

In 2011 he was named one of the "Ten Best Actor Cameos" in the video game L.A. Noire. In 2013 he received the LA Weekly Theatre Award for Best Musical Ensemble as part of the cast of Silence! The Musical. In 2014 he played Roy Disney in When You Wish: The Story of Walt Disney for which he was nominated for Best Featured Actor in a Musical Ovation Award.

Filmography

References

External links

 

Place of birth missing (living people)
Year of birth missing (living people)
Living people
American male television actors
21st-century American male actors
American male stage actors